Nintendocore is a broadly defined style of music that most commonly fuses chiptune and video game music with hardcore punk and/or heavy metal. The genre is sometimes considered a direct subgenre of post-hardcore and a fusion genre between metalcore and chiptune. The genre originated in the early 2000s and peaked around the late 2000s with bands like Horse the Band, An Albatross, The NESkimos and Minibosses pioneering the genre.

Characteristics 

Nintendocore frequently features the use of electric guitars, drum kits, and typical rock instrumentation alongside synthesizers, chiptune, 8-bit sounds, and electronically produced beats. It originated primarily from various subgenres of hardcore punk and/or heavy metal, (such as post-hardcore, metalcore, deathcore, cybergrind, and screamo) but artists in the genre have also incorporated elements of electro, noise rock, hardcore techno, ambient, glitch, breakcore, and post-rock, among others. Nintendocore groups vary stylistically and come from a wide array of influences. Horse the Band combines metalcore, heavy metal, thrash metal, and post-hardcore with post-rock passages. "The Black Hole" from Horse the Band's third album, The Mechanical Hand, is an example of Nintendocore, featuring screamed vocals, heavy "Nintendo riffs," and "sound effects from numerous games." Math the Band includes electro and dance-punk styles. Minibosses use Kyuss-inspired heavy metal riffing, and The Advantage is associated with styles such as noise rock and post-rock. The Depreciation Guild was an indie band that incorporated 8-bit sounds, video game music, and elements of shoegaze.

Some bands feature singing, such as The Depreciation Guild, whose frontman Kurt Feldman provides "ethereal" and "tender vocals," and The Megas, who write lyrics that mirror video game storylines. Others, such as Horse the Band and Math the Band, add screamed vocals into the mix. But yet other groups are strictly instrumental, such as Minibosses, and The Advantage. While otherwise diverse, all Nintendocore groups "use specific instruments to mimic the sounds of Nintendo games."

Etymology 
The term "Nintendocore" is a portmanteau of Nintendo, the popular gaming company from which many of the genre's samples originate and the "core" suffix, which is often used to denote the various subgenres of hardcore punk. The term did not arise until the early 2000s, when the frontman of Horse the Band, Nathan Winneke, originally coined the term "Nintendocore" as a joke. However, several members of the group have since attempted to distance themselves from the descriptor, such as bassist Dashiel Arkenstone, who stated: "I reject it [Nintendocore] because it cheapens our music." Winneke later explained: "It sucks when everybody is just like 'Oh this song about your mom getting beat, what game is this about?' we're very serious most of the time about our music and art, it's only a reference to the idea of blending the digital music of the games and things we grew up on with all the other music we love. It was just a fun idea at the time but everyone took it a hundred yards too far."

History

Precursors (Late 1970s-1990s)
Emerging in the late 70's, synthpop pioneers Yellow Magic Orchestra, sampled Space Invaders sounds in their influential 1978 debut album (self-titled), particularly the hit song "Computer Game." In turn, the band would have a major influence on much of the video game music produced during the 8-bit and 16-bit eras, often referred to as the Golden age of arcade video games. Former Yellow Magic Orchestra member Haruomi Hosono also released a 1984 album produced entirely from Namco arcade game samples entitled ‘Video Game Music’, an early example of a chiptune record.

The pop group Buckner & Garcia can also be considered a precursor to the genre, as they are the very first band to write and record an entire album about video arcade games, and even used sampled arcade game sound effects in their songs. Their 1981 album called Pac-Man Fever contained songs such as Do The Donkey Kong (based on a game which was produced by Nintendo).

The first known rock band to cover a video game song from an actual game however was the all-female indie rock group Autoclave with their cover of the theme song from the popular video game Paperboy which was recorded in 1990. The second rock group known to cover a video game song was the band Mr. Bungle, with their live cover of the Super Mario Bros. theme song, which was a regular staple throughout their 1990s’ live concert setlist. Mr. Bungle also sampled sounds from video games on their debut album from 1991.

Origins and recent developments (2000s-present)
Horse the Band, the group who originally coined the term have released five studio albums in the Nintendocore style, starting with 2000's Secret Rhythm of the Universe.

Another Nintendocore pioneer is The Advantage, whom The New York Times praises as one of the groups who brought video game music into the mainstream modern music spotlight. The Advantage is an instrumental rock band formed by two students attending Nevada Union High School. Spencer Seim first heard the original two band members play at a 1999 Nevada Union High School talent show, beginning his musical career, and continued to lead the group forward after high school. The group "plays nothing but music from the original Nintendo console games." By creating rock cover versions of video game sound tracks, they have "brought legitimacy to a style of music dubbed Nintendocore."

The Phoenix-based rock group, Minibosses, "[is] one of the most well-established bands in the Nintendocore genre, with an impressive roster of covers including Contra, Double Dragon, Excitebike," and covers of other video game themes. Minibosses is known as one of the primary representatives of Nintendo rock, performing at various video game expositions. In addition to covers, the band has also produced original work. The Harvard Crimson refers to Minibosses as "sworn rivals" of The NESkimos, another Nintendocore practitioner. The 2007 debut album by The Depreciation Guild, In Her Gentle Jaws has been referred to as Nintendocore by Pitchfork Media. The website wrote that "In Her Gentle Jaws sticks its neck out further than Nintendocore staples like The Advantage or Minibosses", and that the album's instrumental title track "could plausibly come from an NES cartridge."

Math the Band formed in 2002 and  made use of "analog synthesizers, vintage drum machines, old video game systems and shitty guitars" which helped define the sound that is commonly associated with Nintendocore. Having played shows in the U.K., Mexico, and Canada with a variety of artists and rappers, they have helped spread the genre to venues outside of the United States. Math the Band is one of the bands with the Nintendocore sound still active today, performing at MAGFest 2020 and their latest album "Flange Factory Five" releasing in October 2020.

In 2016 a small group of modern Nintendocore artists including Unicorn Hole, Polygon Horizon, and Got Item released a compilation album themed after Super Smash Brothers 64. This album was released by the net label "Nintendocore Lives", in an attempt to revitalize the genre.

See also
List of Nintendocore bands
Chiptune
Nerdcore
Video game music cover bands
Koji Kondo
MAGFest
Metalcore

Notes

References

 
Metalcore genres
Hardcore punk genres
Heavy metal genres
Fusion music genres
Extreme metal
Internet memes
Chiptune